Urban assault vehicle or Urban Assault Vehicle may refer to:
 EM-50 Urban Assault Vehicle, a fictional armored personnel carrier from 1981 American war comedy film Stripes
 Any fictional combat vehicle from 1998 computer game Urban Assault
 "Rollin' (Urban Assault Vehicle)", a version of Limp Bizkit song "Rollin

See also
 Urban Assault Weapon